GAS Kilkis (full name: Gymnastic Athletic Club Kilkis, Γ.Α.Σ. Κιλκίς) is a Greek handball and beach handball club based in Kilkis. It was founded in 1980 and has played in A1 ethniki (first-tier division) many consecutive years. It has won one cup, in 2004. The home arena of the club is the municipal gymnasium of Kilkis and the club's colours are blue and red.

History
GAS Kilkis was founded in 1980. Few year later it promoted to A1 Ethniki and the 1993–94 season played in the final of the championship. Overall, GAS Kilkis has played three times in the finals of the championship and ranked in 2nd place, the years 1994, 2000 and 2008. It has won one Greek cup in 2004 and even two times it was a Greek cup finalist. The previous season, GAS Kilkis, which had been demoted to A2 Ethniki, placed 11th overall. The club has also youth teams, two of them, the Men's U-16 team and women U-16 team have won the championship in 1990.

The beach handball team has won the Men's European Beach Tour Finals 2016.

Recent seasons

Honours

National 
 Greek Handball Cup
Winner (1): 2004
Finalist (2): 1999, 2005
 Greek Handball Championship
Finalist (3): 1994, 2000, 2008

European 
European Beach Tour Finals: 
Winner (1): 2016

References

Greek handball clubs
Kilkis